Sodium ferulate, the sodium salt of ferulic acid, is a compound used in traditional Chinese medicine thought to be useful for treatment of cardiovascular and cerebrovascular diseases and to prevent thrombosis, although there is no high-quality clinical evidence for such effects. It is found in the root of Angelica sinensis. As of 2005, it was under preliminary clinical research in China.  Ferulic acid can also be extracted from the root of the Chinese herb Ligusticum chuanxiong.

Kraft Foods patented the use of sodium ferulate to mask the aftertaste of  the artificial sweetener acesulfame potassium.

References 

Dietary supplements
Food additives
Bitter-masking compounds
O-methylated hydroxycinnamic acids
Salts of carboxylic acids
Organic sodium salts
Vinylogous carboxylic acids